Jung-hee, also spelled as Jeong-hee, Jeong-hui, Chung-hee, or in North Korea as Jong-hui, is a Korean unisex given name. The meaning differs based on the hanja used to write each syllable of the name. There are 65 hanja with the reading "jung" and 25 hanja with the reading "hee" on the South Korean government's official list of hanja which may be registered for use in given names. Jung-hee was the fourth-most popular name for newborn girls in South Korea in 1950, falling to sixth place by 1960.

People with this name include:

Artists, scholars, and writers
Kim Jeong-hui (1786–1856), Joseon Dynasty male calligrapher
Choe Jeong-hui (1912–1990), South Korean female writer
Moon Chung-hee (born 1947), South Korean female poet
Oh Jung-hee (born 1947), South Korean female writer
Cheon Jung-hee, South Korean male mathematician
Chunghee Sarah Soh, South Korean-born American sociocultural anthropologist

Entertainers
Yoon Jeong-hee (born Son Mi-ja, 1944), South Korean actress
Jang Jung-hee (born 1958), South Korean actress
Moon Jung-hee (born 1976), South Korean actress
Yoon Jung-hee (born 1980), South Korean actress
Lee Jung-hee (born 1981), stage name Lee Jung, South Korean singer
Lim Jeong-hee (born 1981), South Korean female R&B singer

Politicians
Park Chung-hee (1917–1979), South Korean male general and politician, leader of South Korea from 1963 until his death
Lee Jung-hee (born 1969), South Korean female lawyer and politician

Sportspeople
Lee Jeong-hui (born 1965), South Korean female gymnast
Park Jeong-hui (born 1966), South Korean male judoka
Park Jung-hee (sport shooter) (born 1967), South Korean male sport shooter
Park Chung-hee (handballer) (born 1975), South Korean female handball player
Ri Jong-hui (born 1975), North Korean female football goalkeeper
Ji Jung-hee (born 1985), South Korean female volleyball player
Cho Jung-hui, North Korean female table tennis player

Others
Lee Jeonghee (born 1963), South Korean female abacus master
Chun Jung-hee (born 1983), South Korean male professional computer game player

Fictional characters
Ryeon Jung-hee, female character portrayed by Jeon Ji-hyun in 2013 South Korean film The Berlin File

See also
List of Korean given names
Choi Jung-hui (born 1951), South Korean female speed skater
Lee Chung-hee (basketball) (born 1959), South Korean male basketball player
Lee Chung-hee (swimmer) (born 1981), South Korean male swimmer
Kim Jong-hui (born 1980), North Korean female speed skater
Yu Jong-hui (born 1986), North Korean female football defender

References

Korean unisex given names